The 2018–19 season was Burnley's 137th competitive season, their third consecutive in the Premier League and their 56th in top flight English football. Along with the Premier League, the club competed in the FA Cup, EFL Cup and UEFA Europa League. This was the club's first qualification to a European competition in 51 years.

The season covered the period from 1 July 2018 to 30 June 2019.

Match details

Premier League

League table

Results summary

Matches

FA Cup
The third round draw was made live on BBC by Ruud Gullit and Paul Ince from Stamford Bridge on 3 December 2018. The fourth round draw was made live on BBC by Robbie Keane and Carl Ikeme from Wolverhampton on 7 January 2019.

EFL Cup

UEFA Europa League

Qualifying stage

Transfers

In

 Brackets around club names denote the player's contract with that club had expired before he joined Burnley.

Out

Loans out

Appearances and goals
Source:
Numbers in parentheses denote appearances as substitute.
Players with names struck through and marked  left the club during the playing season.
Players with names in italics and marked * were on loan from another club for the whole of their season with Burnley.
Players listed with no appearances have been in the matchday squad but only as unused substitutes.
Key to positions: GK – Goalkeeper; DF – Defender; MF – Midfielder; FW – Forward

References

Burnley F.C. seasons
Burnley
Burnley